The Société d'Études Coloniales was a society that promoted the creation and maintenance of Belgian overseas colonies which was established in 1894. By 1902 it had a library.

Auguste Couvreur served briefly as its first chairman. Other members included . "Of the twenty-nine founding members of the Société, fourteen had civil functions (eleven were lawyers), nine were intellectuals,...five were soldiers,...one was a businessman.

As of 2008, the Society's archives were reported to have been lost.

See also
 Institut Royal Colonial Belge (est. 1928)

References

This article incorporates information from the Dutch Wikipedia and French Wikipedia.

Bibliography
issued by the society
  1894-
  1900 ed.
  via Google Books

about the society

External links
 WorldCat. Société d'études coloniales (Belgium)
 Archive Société d'études coloniales, Royal museum of central Africa

1894 establishments in Belgium
Belgian colonial empire
Defunct organisations based in Belgium